The Police Act 1890 (53 & 54 Vict. c. 45) was an Act of the Parliament of the United Kingdom setting up a system of police pensions. A similar system for Scottish forces was established by the Police (Scotland) Act 1890 (53 & 54 Vict. c. 67).

Only a system of discretionary pensions for injury had previously existed. The Acts set a requirement of at least 25 years' service, reduced to 15 (England and Wales) or 20 (Scotland) years for retirement due to "infirmity of mind or body" and waived for retirement due to injury in the line of duty. They also established discretionary gratuities for retirement due to infirmity.

They also covered widows' pensions and children's allowances for officers dying whilst still in service "from the effect of an injury received in the execution of his duty". It also instituted similar widows' and children's allowances if an officer died from any other cause whilst still in service and widows' and children's pensions and gratuities if he died less than a year after retiring due to injury, though unlike the pensions for injury these were all at the discretion of individual police forces.

Notes

References

United Kingdom Acts of Parliament 1890
Police legislation in the United Kingdom
Pensions in the United Kingdom